Mantonipatus is a monospecific genus of velvet worm containing the single species Mantonipatus persiculus. Females of this species range from 8 mm to 33 mm in length, whereas males range from 8 mm to 20 mm. This species has 15 pairs of oncopods (legs) and is found in South Australia.

References 

Onychophorans of Australasia
Onychophoran genera
Monotypic protostome genera
Fauna of South Australia
Endemic fauna of Australia